Longqing (9 February 1567 – 1 February 1573) was the era name of the Longqing Emperor, the 13th emperor of the Ming dynasty of China. The Ming dynasty used the era name Longqing for a total of 6 years. During the Longqing period, the Ming dynasty adopted a series of new policies to revive the country's prestige. It was known in historiography as the "New Governance of Longqing" (隆慶新政).

On 19 July 1572 (Longqing 6, 10th day of the 6th month), the Wanli Emperor ascended to the throne and continued to use. The era was changed to Wanli in the following year.

Births
 1568 (Longqing 2) – Wei Zhongxian, eunuch (d. 1627)

Deaths
 Zeng Yiben (曾一本): A famous pirate who was arrested and executed in the third year of Longqing era.
 Zhu Zaiji, the Longqing Emperor (Emperor Muzong of Ming): Emperor of the Ming dynasty of China.

Comparison table

Other regime era names that existed during the same period
 Vietnam
 Sùng Khang (崇康, 1568–1578): Mạc dynasty — era name of Mạc Mậu Hợp
 Thiên Hựu (天祐, 1557): Later Lê dynasty — era name of Lê Anh Tông
 Chính Trị (正治, 1558–1571): Later Lê dynasty — era name of Lê Anh Tông
 Hồng Phúc (洪福, 1572): Later Lê dynasty — era name of Lê Anh Tông
 Japan
 Eiroku (永禄, 1558–1570): era name of Emperor Ōgimachi
 Genki (元亀, 1570–1573): era name of Emperor Ōgimachi

See also
 List of Chinese era names
 List of Ming dynasty era names

References

Further reading

Ming dynasty eras